Euspilapteryx is a genus of moths in the family Gracillariidae.

Species
Euspilapteryx auroguttella Stephens, 1835
Euspilapteryx crypta Vári, 1961

References

External links
Global Taxonomic Database of Gracillariidae (Lepidoptera) 

Gracillariinae
Gracillarioidea genera